Pamir Airways was a privately owned airline headquartered in Kabul, Afghanistan, operating scheduled passenger flights out of Kabul International Airport. The company name is derived from the Pamir Mountains and translates "roof of the world".

History
As the first private airline in the history of the country, Pamir Airways was issued an Air Operator's Certificate in 1994  by the authorities then in charge of civil aviation in the Islamic State of Afghanistan. Flight operations were launched in 1995 with an initial fleet of one Boeing 707-300 and two Antonov An-12 aircraft.

In April 2008, Pamir Airways was taken over by a group of Afghan businessmen under the leadership of Sherkhan Farnood, the president of the Afghanistan Chamber of Commerce & Industries and former chairman of Kabul Bank, who subsequently became chairman of the airline. Following the investment, Pamir Airways received a loan for $98 million from Kabul Bank, which was later exposed as one having indescribably poor lending standards (e.g. little to no interest required, no collateral required and repayment essentially optional) An effort was made to re-organize the Pamir assets, including its aging fleet of grounded planes, which could not be sold at high enough prices to reclaim the funds, though. As a consequence, the license of the airline was withdrawn, officially due to the poor safety record on 19 March 2011.

Destinations 
Upon closure, Pamir Airways operated scheduled services to the following destinations:

Afghanistan
Herat - Herat Airfield
Kabul - Kabul International Airport Hub
Kandahar - Kandahar Airport
Lashkar Gah - Bost Airport
Mazar-i-Sharif - Mazar-i-Sharif Airport
India
Delhi - Indira Gandhi International Airport
Saudi Arabia
Jeddah - King Abdulaziz International Airport
Riyadh - King Khalid International Airport
Tajikistan
Dushanbe - Dushanbe Airport
United Arab Emirates
Dubai - Dubai International Airport

During the Hajj season, Pamir Airways played a major role in taking Afghan pilgrims to Saudi Arabia (9,000 in 2004 and 15,000 in 2005).

Fleet 

Over the years, Pamir Airways operated the following aircraft types:

Incidents and accidents 
On 17 May 2010, Pamir Airways Flight 112, an Antonov An-24, crashed into Salang Pass, 100 km north of Kabul, Afghanistan. The plane was en route from Kunduz Airport to Kabul, when it suddenly disappeared from radar.

References

External links

Official website

Defunct airlines of Afghanistan
Airlines established in 1994
Airlines disestablished in 2011
Airlines formerly banned in the European Union
1994 establishments in Afghanistan
2010s disestablishments in Afghanistan